Caxito  is a town, with a population of 55,000 (2014), and a commune in the municipality of Dande, province of Bengo, Angola. It is also the capital of the Bengo province.

Transportation
The northern line of Angolan Railways passes through the town.

References

Populated places in Bengo Province
Communes in Bengo Province
Provincial capitals in Angola